Karachi is the largest and most populous city in Pakistan. The population of Karachi is estimated to be around 16 million (16,093,786) in 2020. The population and demographic distribution in the megacity has undergone numerous changes over the past 150 years. On 14 August 1947, when it became the capital city of Pakistan, its population was about 450,000 inhabitants However, the population rapidly grew with large influx of Muslim refugees after independence in 1947. By 1951, the city population had crossed one million mark. in the following decade, the rate of growth of Karachi was over 80 percent. Today, the city has grown 60 times its size in 1947 when it became the country's first capital. Although, Islamabad remains the nation's capital since the 1960s, the city's population continues to grow at about 5% per annum, largely thanks to its strong economic base.

A person from Karachi is known as a Karachiite.

Migration 
Whereas most megacities in the developing world have grown out of rural-urban migration from the countryside not too distant from them, Karachi's demographics are the largely contributed by long-distance immigration. Before the independence of Pakistan, Karachi already had a diverse mix of religions and ethnic groups. After the independence, most of the Urdu speaking Muslim refugees of the partition of India settled in Karachi. Likewise, a large number of Hindus left the city in 1947 due to Hindu-Muslim riots and settled in India. Predominantly Urdu speaking Muslim refugees known as Muhajirs formed the dominant ethnic group in Karachi. Muhajirs originated from different parts of India and brought with them their local cultures and cuisines, thus further adding to the already diverse mix of people that earlier inhabited Karachi. Currently, these older groups of people and continuing migration from different parts of Pakistan have contributed to a rich and diverse mix of people that live in Karachi. This has further been diversified with migration from other non-traditional countries such as by Arabs, people from different Middle Eastern countries, as well as Afghans and more recently Central Asians and Uighurs. This has given the city a very metropolitan character, and has earned it the title as the melting pot of Pakistan.

Demographic history of Karachi 

Karachi's inhabitants, locally known as Karachiites, are composed of ethno-linguistic groups from all parts of Pakistan, as well as migrants from South Asia, making the city's population a diverse melting pot. At the end of the 19th century, the population of the city was about 105,000, with a gradual increase over the next few decades, reaching more than 400,000 on the eve of independence. Estimates of the population range from 15 to 18 million, of which an estimated 90% are migrants from different backgrounds. The city's population is estimated to be growing at about 5% per year (mainly as a result of internal rural-urban migration), including an estimated 45,000 migrant workers coming to the city every month from different parts of Pakistan.

The earliest inhabitants of the area that became Karachi were Sindhi tribes such as the Jokhio, Mallaah and Jat in the east and Baloch in the west and. Before the end of British colonial rule and the subsequent independence of Pakistan in 1947, the population of the city was majority Sindhi and Baloch Muslims, Hindus and Sikhs community numbering around 250,000 residents. The city was, and still is home to a large community of Gujarati Muslims who were one of the earliest settlers in the city, and still form the majority in Saddar Town. Important Gujarati Muslim communities in the city include the Memon, Chhipa, Ghanchi, Khoja, Bohra and Tai. Other early settlers included the Marwari Muslims, Parsis originally from Iran, Marathi Muslims and Konkani Muslims from Maharashtra (settled in Kokan Town), Goan Catholics and Anglo-Indians. Most Hindus and Sikhs migrated to India after independence of Pakistan. There are still small communities of Parsis, Goan Catholics and Anglo-Indians in the city.

After the independence of Pakistan large numbers of Indian Muslims, mainly Urdu-speaking people, migrated to Karachi. There is also a sizeable community of Marathi Muslims and Malayali Muslims in Karachi (the Mappila), originally from Kerala in South India. The Marathi and Malayali Muslims in Karachi have intermarried with the other Muslims especially with Memon and Urdu-speaking Muslims and now have integrated into the wider Urdu-speaking Muhajir community.
Since last few decades population of the Sindhis are also increasing dramatically.

The Pashtuns, originally from Khyber Pakhtunkhwa, Afghanistan, the Federally Administered Tribal Areas and northern Balochistan, are now the city's second largest ethnic group after Muhajirs, these Pashtuns are settled in Karachi from decades. With as high as 7 million by some estimates the city of Karachi in Pakistan has the largest concentration of urban Pakhtun population in the world, including 50,000 registered Afghan refugees in the city, meaning there are more Pashtuns in Karachi than in any other city in the world.  However, according to the census 2017 of the Pakistan, the total population of the Pashtuns in Sindh is approximately 2.5 million (5% of the total sindh) and it will make around 10-13 percent of the Pashtoons living in Karachi's population.

Districts Population Density per Sq.km.

According to 2017 Census, Karachi Central is the most densely populated district not only among six districts of Karachi, but also allover Pakistan with 43,063.51 persons living per square kilometres.

Ethnic groups 

The ethnic groups in Karachi include members from all ethnic groups in Pakistan, making the city's population a diverse melting pot. At the end of the 19th century, the population of the city was about 105,000, with a gradual increase over the next few decades, reaching more than 400,000 on the eve of independence. Estimates of the population are approximately 23,000,000, of which an estimated 90% are migrants from different backgrounds. The city's population is estimated to be growing at about 5% per year (mainly as a result of internal rural-urban migration), including an estimated 45,000 migrant workers coming to the city every month from different parts of Pakistan. According to the community leaders and social scientists there are over 1.6 million Bengalis and up to 400,000 Rohingyas living in Karachi.

Religion 

According to a 1998 census of Pakistan, the religious breakdown of the city is as follows: Muslim (96.45%), Christian (2.42%), Hindu (0.86%), and other (0.27%). Other religious groups include Sikhs, Buddhists, Parsis, Baháʼís, Ahmedis and Jews. Of the Muslims, approximately 73% are Sunnis and 27% are Shi'ites.

Trivia
Stunned by Karachi's diverse demographics, the American political scientist and South Asia expert Stephen P. Cohen once stated that if Karachi's ethnic groups "got along well, it would be an amazingly complex city, a lot like New York."

See also
 Demographic history of Karachi
 Ethnic groups in Karachi
 Religion in Karachi
 Demographics of Sindh
 Demographics of Pakistan
 List of metropolitan areas by population

References 
 :)

Further reading
 The Political Ethnicity and the State of Pakistan

 
Metropolitan areas of Pakistan
Karachi